Hallunda metro station is a station on the red line of the Stockholm metro, located in Hallunda, Botkyrka Municipality. The station was opened on 12 January 1975 as part of the extension from Fittja to Norsborg.

References

Red line (Stockholm metro) stations
Railway stations opened in 1975
1975 establishments in Sweden